FC Helsingør is a Danish football club from Helsingør. The club plays in the Danish 1st Division, having been promoted after winning the Danish 2nd Division in the 2019-2020 season. The club has finished the last two seasons in the top 4 of the Danish 1st Division.

History

The club was formed on 1 August 2005 when the five Elsinore clubs Helsingør IF, Helsingør FC, Frem Hellebæk IF, Vapnagaard FK72 and Snekkersten IF merged under the name Elite 3000 Fodbold. In 2012, the club changed its name to FC Helsingør. The club plays at Helsingør Stadion. The club moved to the new Helsingør Stadion in the summer of 2019.

On 4 July 2020, FC Helsingør won the Danish 2nd Division, and clinched promotion back to the Danish 1st Division for the 2020–21 season.

FC Helsingør finished the 2020-21 season in 4th place with a record of 16 wins, 11 losses, 5 ties.

FC Helsingør finished the 2021-22 season again in 4th place, with an improved record of 16 wins, 9 losses, 7 ties.

Players

Current squad
''As of 7 March 2023

Youth players in use 2022/23

Out on loan

Staff

Chairman / Owner
  Jordan Gardner

Director
  Jim Kirks

Head Coach
  Morten Eskesen

Assistant Coach
  Mikkel Thygesen

Goalkeeper Coach
  Simon Toftegaard Hansen

Sporting Director

Notes

External links
Official website

 
Football clubs in Denmark
Association football clubs established in 2005
2005 establishments in Denmark
FC Helsingor